See Tira for other sites with similar names. 

At Tiri is a village located in the Caza of Bint Jbeil in the Nabatiye Governorate in Lebanon. It is also the location of two pre-historic archaeological sites.

History
Taire I (referred to as Et Taireh I) is located 3.5 km north of Ain Ebel to the west of the village. The exact location of the site is unknown and the assemblage found was small and of indeterminable date. It was only mentioned in passing by Paul Bovier-Lapierre in 1908 and Karge in 1918.

Taire II (referred to as Et Taireh II and Bassatine el Khawabi) is a Heavy Neolithic archaeological site of the Qaraoun culture. A collection was made south of the track at 690 m above sea level by Jesuit archaeologist Henri Fleisch, who did not publish it but confirmed that the Qaraoun culture was present this far south via personal communication to Lorraine Copeland. The collection is held by the Museum of Lebanese Prehistory at the Saint Joseph University.

Ottoman era
In 1596, it was named as a village, Taira  in the Ottoman nahiya (subdistrict) of  Tibnin  under the liwa' (district) of Safad, with a population of  29  households and 7 bachelors, all Muslim. The villagers paid a fixed tax rate of 25% on  agricultural products, such as wheat, barley, fruit trees, goats and beehives, in addition to "occasional revenues" and a fixed sum; a total of 1,656 akçe.

In 1838, Edward Robinson noted the village on his travels in the region.

In 1875, Victor Guérin visited, and found it to be a village with 150 "Metualis". He further noted:  "Here is a little mosque, some of the cut stones in which have probably been taken from some ancient building now destroyed. Other cut stones of similar appearance, and trunks of columns scattered about the village, belong apparently to the same monument. A great birkeh, partly cut in the rock and partly built of medium-sized regular stones, adjoins the houses. Broken sarcophagi are lying about: their lids have acroteria."

In 1881, the PEF's Survey of Western Palestine (SWP)  described it: "A small stone village, containing about eighty Metawileh, in narrow valley, with grapes, a few olives, and figs ; many cisterns in and round village ; on hill-side old masonry birket.”

"Many old and well-cut stones and broken fragments of a pillar were observed at this village, showing probably early Christian occupation. An old masonry birkeh and a large sarcophagus, for three bodies under one lid, was observed. Three-quarters of a mile to the south-east there is a dolmen on the side of the road of small dimensions."

Modern era
The village is noted for the At Tiri Incident: an April 1980 confrontation between the United Nations Interim Force in Lebanon (UNIFIL) and the South Lebanon Army in which three Irish Army soldiers were killed.

On July 23, during the 2006 Lebanon War, 3 civilians from At Tiri were killed while 13 others were wounded by Israel, as they were trying to flee the village. The Lebanese Red Cross in Tyre said ten vehicles carrying civilians and three or four motorcycles had been attacked by the IDF the same day making a total of forty-one injured (two critically), and three dead in attacks on convoys.

Notable people 

 Hassan "Moni" Chaito (born 1989), Lebanese footballer
Hassan "Shibriko" Chaito (born 1991), Lebanese footballer

References

Bibliography

External links
Survey of Western Palestine, Map 4: IAA, Wikimedia commons 
 Tiri, Localiban

Archaeological sites in Lebanon
Heavy Neolithic sites
Populated places in the Israeli security zone 1985–2000
Neolithic settlements
Populated places in Bint Jbeil District